Körlübeyi (or Körlü Beyi; formerly Gürlü) is a village in Tarsus district of Mersin Province, Turkey. It is situated in Çukurova (Cilicia of the antiquity). The population of village was 73 as of 2012. Former name of the village was Gürlü. Main economic activity is farming and the major crop is grape.

References

Villages in Tarsus District